True World Foods is an American food service company. It is controlled by the Unification Church.

History 
The Unification Church's foray into the seafood industry began at the direction of Reverend Moon who delivered a speech in 1980 entitled "The Way of Tuna" in which he claimed that "After we build the boats, we catch the fish and process them for the market, and then have a distribution network. This is not just on the drawing board; I have already done it." and declared himself the "king of the ocean." The Church has denied controlling True World. True World is controlled by the Unification Church. In 1980 True World Foods was founded as The Rainbow Fish House on Elston Avenue in Chicago by five Japanese and American members of the Unification Church. Takeshi Yashiro, one of the five founders, later claimed that Sun Myung Moon himself had founded the company. True World Foods which took over The Rainbow Fish House was incorporated in 1976 by Bo Hi Pak, chief aid to Reverend Moon.

By 2006 True World Foods controlled a major portion of the sushi trade in the US and employed hundreds of people with annual revenues of $250 million.

During the COVID-19 pandemic the company launched home delivery sushi kits to make up for a lack of sales to restaurants.

Operations

Alaska 
An incident at the True World processing plant in Kodiak, Alaska led to the company pleading guilty in federal court and fined $150,000. The facility had accepted a load of pollock which was in excess of the trip limit for the offloading vessel.

Michigan 
True World operated a processing plant in suburban Detroit which was closed after repeated conflict with the Food and Drug Administration.

Massachusetts 
The company operates significant operations in Gloucester, Massachusetts.

Washington 
True World operates a regional distribution center in Vancouver, Washington.

New Jersey 
In 2013 the company was headquartered in New Jersey.

Subsidiaries 
 International Lobster

See also 
 FCF Co., Ltd.
 Bolton Group
 Itochu

References 

Fish processing companies
Unification Church
Seafood companies of the United States